The God Machine is the twelfth studio album by German power metal band Blind Guardian, released on 2 September 2022 through Nuclear Blast. This is the band's first regular studio album in seven years, following Beyond the Red Mirror (2015), marking the longest gap between two Blind Guardian studio albums (although a previous album was released three years earlier under the name "Blind Guardian Twilight Orchestra").

Background and recording
Production of The God Machine took place throughout the global COVID-19 pandemic; however some of the songs were written before 2020. Frontman Hansi Kürsch feared unforeseeable individual and social consequential damage from the pandemic. "For us, however, it was good from a creative point of view because we were able to take our time. We could think: What do we actually want? It has to represent us and it has to represent the time", Kürsch confirms the influence. "For me it could have been even a bit heavier. During the pre-production I was even involved in Death Metal at times. But the other band members vetoed that."

"We didn't want to rehash our qualities from 1995, but didn't want to continue down this complex path forever either. The God Machine is a new beginning for us. We've set a new course and gone back to certain things that we've neglected a bit on the last few albums", Kürsch told music publications in May 2022.

Critical reception

Marcel Rapp of powermetal.de praised the album, comparing it to 1990s Blind Guardian records: "Is The God Machine the best album after Nightfall in Middle-Earth? Possibly, because you haven't heard the Krefeld band so determined, heavy and direct since 1998."

Travis Green of My Global Mind wrote: "Fans of any of the band’s previous works should find a lot to love here, while any fan of the genre who somehow hasn't discovered the band yet would do no better than to start with this album, as it’s one of the band’s finest efforts to date!"

Lyrical references

"Deliver Us from Evil" is about Arthur Miller's play The Crucible.
"Damnation" is about The Kingkiller Chronicle, a fantasy series written by Patrick Rothfuss.
"Secrets of the American Gods" references Neil Gaiman's fantasy novel American Gods.
"Violent Shadows" is about Kaladin Stormblessed and his life as a bridgeman in Brandon Sanderson's fantasy novel series The Stormlight Archive.
"Life Beyond the Spheres" is about the creation of the universe, (The Big Bang specifically) the first moments after the beginning of everything, and the evolution of space and time.
"Architects of Doom" references the science fiction franchise Battlestar Galactica.
"Let It Be No More" deals with the death of frontman Hansi Kürsch's mother, as well as The Leftovers.
"Blood of the Elves" references the first novel in The Witcher series, Blood of Elves, written by Andrzej Sapkowski.
"Destiny" is inspired by the tale The Ice-Maiden written by Hans Christian Andersen.

Track listing

Personnel
Blind Guardian
 Hansi Kürsch – vocals
 André Olbrich – lead guitar
 Marcus Siepen – rhythm guitar
 Frederik Ehmke – drums

Guest musicians
 Barend Courbois – bass
 Thomas Geiger – effects and keyboards
 Joost van den Broek – keyboards on "Life Beyond the Spheres"

Charts

References

2022 albums
Blind Guardian albums
Nuclear Blast albums